Bioglio is a comune (municipality) in the Province of Biella in the Italian region Piedmont, located about  northeast of Turin and about  northeast of Biella.

Bioglio borders the following municipalities: Callabiana, Camandona, Mosso, Pettinengo, Piatto, Piedicavallo, Tavigliano, Ternengo, Vallanzengo, Valle Mosso, Valle San Nicolao, Veglio.

Notable natives
 Antonio Benedetto Carpano

References

Bioglio